Italy First may refer to:
Italy First (airline)
Italy First (political alliance)
Italy First (political party)